Conceited may refer to:

 Conceited (rapper)
 "Conceited" (song), a 2022 rap song by Flo Milli
 "Conceited (There's Something About Remy)", a 2005 single by Remy Ma
 Conceited, a 1987 album by Kyper

See also 

 
 Conceit (disambiguation)